Archibald Franklin Spooner (1886–1965) was an English cricketer. A right-handed batsman, he played for Lancashire between 1906 and 1909. His brother Reginald played Test cricket for England.

Biography

Born on 21 May 1886 in Litherland, near Liverpool, Lancashire in 1886, Spooner played twice for the Lancashire Second XI in 1902, and twice for Liverpool and District in 1904, against Cambridge University and South Africa. After a second match for Liverpool and District against Cambridge University in July 1906, he played two County Championship matches for Lancashire that month, against Somerset and Sussex.

He did not play for Lancashire in 1907, but played a fuller season in 1908, playing 15 County Championship matches. He played a final time for Lancashire in 1909, against Essex. He played for the Federated Malay States against the Straits Settlements in 1911. He died in Devon on 11 January 1965.

References

1886 births
1965 deaths
People from Litherland
English cricketers
Federated Malay States cricketers
Lancashire cricketers